Clayton Maurice Beauford (born March 1, 1963) is a former professional American football player who played wide receiver in 1987 for the Cleveland Browns.  Beauford graduated from Palatka High School in Palatka, Florida in 1981.  He played college football for Auburn University from 1981 to 1984.  In October 1982, he scored a touchdown on a 60-yard pass play against Georgia Tech.  In 1984, he was the subject of an investigation in which it was alleged that his high school records had been altered to allow him to attend Auburn on a football scholarship.  The principal, assistant principal, a masonry teacher and another person at the high school were later charged with official misconduct, filing false reports, or perjury in the matter.  Beauford was drafted by the Detroit Lions but spent the 1985 season on the injury list after sustaining a broken kneecap in the 1985 Senior Bowl.  He was released by the Lions in August 1986.  Beauford also played in the USFL for the Birmingham Stallions. In 1987, he played for the Cleveland Browns, appearing in only one game with a kick return of 22 yards.

References

External links
Pro-Football-Reference

1963 births
Living people
People from Palatka, Florida
Players of American football from Florida
American football wide receivers
Auburn Tigers football players
Cleveland Browns players